Events from the year 1720 in Denmark.

Incumbents
 Monarch – Frederick IV
 Grand Chancellor – Christian Christophersen Sehested

Events
 8 April  The County of Gyldensteen on Funen is established by Jean Henri Huguetan Gyldensteen from the manors of Gyldensteen, Sandagergård, Oregård, Hugget, Harritslevgård, Uggerslevgård and Jerstrup.
 3 July – The Treaty of Frederiksborg is signed at Frederiksborg Castle, ending the Great Northern War.

Births
 4 January  Henrik Fisker (died 1797)
 1 August – Hans Diderik Brinck-Seidelin, Supreme Court justice and landowner (died 1778)

Undated
 Johannes Rach, painter (died 1783 in the Dutch East Indies)
 Else Hansen, royal mistress (died 1784)

Deaths

 5 July – Berte Skeel, noblewoman (born 1644)

References

 
1720s in Denmark
Denmark
Years of the 18th century in Denmark